Kalyeserye was a 30-minute to 1-hour soap opera parody aired live as part of the "Juan for All, All for Juan" segment of Philippine daytime variety show Eat Bulaga! on GMA Network and worldwide on GMA Pinoy TV featuring the popular loveteam of Alden Richards and Maine Mendoza, known as AlDub, as well as the hosts of the said segment, Jose Manalo, Wally Bayola, and Paolo Ballesteros, portraying various characters. Eat Bulaga! hosts also serve as narrators and commentators. The term is coined by eat Bulaga host Joey De Leon which means "street series" because it is like a TV series where the setting is on streets in a remote barangay in the Philippines. It officially premiered on July 16, 2015, when Yaya Dub (played by Maine Mendoza) meets Alden for the first time. The segment concluded on December 17, 2016, after 400 episodes. 

The show follows the love story of Yaya Dub and Alden. Yaya Dub's employer and adoptive grandmother, Lola Nidora, is initially against the couple's budding romance. Lola Nidora then reveals her Book of Secrets/Secret Diary which contains various reasons for her disapproval. The appearance of other characters like the luxurious Frankie Arenolli and the socialite DuhRizz make things even more complicated for the amorous pair. As the story unfolds, characters from Lola Nidora and Yaya Dub's past are revealed as a part of their backstory. Lola Nidora turns out to be one of the triplet children of the Zobeyala Family. Also, during the course of the series, Alden must prove his trustworthiness and love for Yaya Dub by overcoming several obstacles. For the most part, Lola Nidora provides these challenges to Alden while she imparts to Yaya the values of "love at the right time" and other words of wisdom.   According to Mon Bandril, a CSMA member, the series won the Catholic Social Media Awards "because of the inspiring message they give during Kalyeserye [about] virtues, values, chivalry, modesty, morality, respect for elders, etc. This is the kind [of show] that we don't see on TV anymore."

Episodes are numbered by days (e.g. Day 1, Day 2, etc.), and sometimes comprise multiple segments from the Eat Bulaga! variety show in which the characters interact. Hashtags were introduced shortly after Day 1, however, multiple tags were posted regarding episodes. Around July 30, GMA Network and Eat Bulaga! began posting a unique hashtag for each Kalyeserye episode. On September 25, GMA Network acknowledged a Twitter fan group called the trendsetters to supply the official hashtag for their episodes. They have a group chat to discuss which tag to apply to the episodes. Each episode corresponds with a quote or two relating to the episode's theme and notable episodes contain Lola Nidora's words of wisdom; only pertinent ones are listed along with the summaries below.

Series overview

Episodes

Season 1

July 2015

August 2015
Starting July 30, 2015, GMA Network and Eat Bulaga twitter websites began to use hashtags to pool discussion and news about each episode.

September 2015

October 2015

November 2015

December 2015

January 2016

February 2016

March 2016

April 2016

May 2016
This month in KalyeSerye is focused on AlDub in Italy and Lola's Playlist.

June 2016

July 2016

August 2016

September 2016

Season 2

October 2016

November 2016

December 2016

Year-end specials

Year-end specials for 2015
This five-part special took a trip back to the memorable episodes of the series with Manalo, Bayola and Ballesteros as the three Lolas albeit in a capacity as interviewers to common people and not in the continuity of the series' storyline. Also some of the EB Dabarkads hosts take part in this special.

Map of episodes

Notes

References

 Works cited

 Other references

External links
 List of Eat Bulaga videos posted on Facebook

Eat Bulaga!
Kalyeserye
Kalyeserye